Prince Amponsah may refer to:
Prince Amponsah (actor), Canadian actor
Prince Amponsah (footballer) (born 1996), Ghananian footballer who plays as a striker